Raoul Korner (born April 2, 1974) is an Austrian professional basketball coach. He is the current head coach of Hamburg Towers of the German Basketball Bundesliga (BBL).

Career

EiffelTowers Den Bosch (2010–2013)
After several years of coaching in Austria, Korner signed with the Dutch club EiffelTowers Den Bosch in July 2010. In his first season coaching Den Bosch, the team finished at the 3rd place and was defeated in the playoff semifinals. In the 2011–12 season, Korner won the Dutch Basketball League with Den Bosch, by beating Leiden 4–1 in the finals. In his third season, he won the DBL Coach of the Year award. With Den Bosch, he also won his first NBB Cup in 2012–13. After the season Korner's department was announced. His assistant coach Sam Jones became the new head coach.

Phantoms Braunschweig (2013–2016)
In 2013, Korner signed a contract with the German club New Yorker Phantoms Braunschweig.

Korner left Braunschweig on April 30, 2016 and took over head coaching duties at Medi Bayreuth a few days later. He cited Braunschweig's financial condition as a factor in his decision to leave the team.

Medi Bayreuth (2016–2022)
After an impressive start into the season with Bayreuth, Korner was selected as the "Team International" head coach for the 2017 BBL All-Star Game.

Hamburg Towers (2022–present)
After six years at Medi Bayreuth, on June 08, 2022 he signed as head coach at Hamburg Towers of the German Basketball Bundesliga.

References

1974 births
Living people
Austrian basketball coaches
Sportspeople from Vienna
BC Vienna coaches
Medi Bayreuth coaches
Basketball Löwen Braunschweig coaches
Heroes Den Bosch coaches
Traiskirchen Lions players